Nuala Fennell (25 November 1935 – 11 August 2009) was an Irish Fine Gael politician, economist and activist who served as Minister of State from December 1982 to January 1987 with responsibility for Women's Affairs and Family Law. She served as a Teachta Dála (TD) for the Dublin South from 1981 to 1987 and 1989 to 1992. She also served as a Senator from 1987 to 1989.

Fennell was a leading Women's Rights campaigner in the 1970s when she was part of the Irish Women's Liberation Movement, from which she resigned due to differences of policy in 1971. Fennell was involved in setting up the first refuge for "battered women" in Dublin. She was involved in the 1975 campaign for the right to divorce in Ireland.

She was elected at the 1981 general election to the 22nd Dáil, as a Fine Gael TD for Dublin South. After the election, Fine Gael entered into a coalition government with the Labour Party, and Fennell was a prominent Fine Gael backbencher.

Fianna Fáil formed a short-lived following the February 1982 election, but Fine Gael was returned to office later that year following the November 1982 election and Fennell was appointed Minister of State at the Department of the Taoiseach and Minister of State at the Department of Justice, with responsibly for Women's Affairs and Family Law.

She lost her seat at the 1987 general election, and was nominated by the Taoiseach Garret FitzGerald to the 17th Seanad, in his last days serving as Taoiseach. She was then elected to the 18th Seanad on the Labour Panel. At the 1989 general election, she was returned to the 26th Dáil, but retired from politics at the 1992 general election.

References
Fennell, Nuala: Nuala Fennell:political woman:a memoir, Dublin, Currach Press, 2009.

1935 births
2009 deaths
20th-century women Teachtaí Dála
20th-century women members of Seanad Éireann
Fine Gael TDs
Fine Gael senators
Irish birth control activists
Irish feminists
Irish women's rights activists
Members of the 17th Seanad
Members of the 18th Seanad
Members of the 22nd Dáil
Members of the 23rd Dáil
Members of the 24th Dáil
Members of the 26th Dáil
Ministers of State of the 24th Dáil
Nominated members of Seanad Éireann
Women ministers of state of the Republic of Ireland